The 1985–86 Vancouver Canucks season was the team's 16th in the National Hockey League (NHL).

Off-season
Changes were the order of the day after a disastrous 1984-85 campaign. Gone were Vice-President, General Manager, and Head Coach Harry Neale and Associate Coach Ron Smith. Assistant GM Jack Gordon was promoted to GM and Director of Hockey Operations and 1982 Jack Adams Trophy winner Tom Watt was brought in to coach. The team would undergo a cosmetic change as well, altering their jerseys so that the big "V" on the front was replaced by the team logo, while smaller "V"s appeared on the shoulders.

In the Entry Draft, the Canucks took 6'3" right-winger Jim Sandlak with the fourth overall pick. He would play 23 games for the team in the season, collecting four points.

Regular season
Stan Smyl became the first Canuck to reach the 200-goal plateau on November 22 in a 6-5 loss to New Jersey.  Richard Brodeur would earn team MVP honours, appearing in a career-high 64 games and keeping the Canucks in many games they had no business being in.  On February 28, he registered his 100th win as a Canuck in a 3-1 decision over Philadelphia.  Sophomore Petri Skriko earned career high marks in goals (38) and points (78).  His point total led the team but he trailed Tony Tanti by one in the goal department.

Otherwise, the only thing to keep fan interest was the three-way turtle derby between the Canucks, Jets, and Kings for the final two playoff spots in the Smythe Division, since the Oilers and Flames were well ahead of them and had already locked up the top two spots in the division. After a dreadful 20-game stretch in which they went 1-13-6 to drop to 20th overall in the NHL (ahead of only a woeful Detroit squad), the Canucks went 5-4-1 in their last ten to finish tied with Winnipeg for third place in the Smythe with 59 points, while Los Angeles was out with 54. But since the Jets had more wins than the Canucks (26 to 23), Vancouver lost the tiebreaker and claimed fourth place in the Smythe, which meant a first round matchup with the two time defending Stanley Cup champion and Presidents Trophy winning Edmonton Oilers.

Final standings

Schedule and results

Playoffs
The first-round series between the Edmonton Oilers and Vancouver Canucks was quick and painless. Edmonton annihilated Vancouver in Game One by a 7-3 score. They completed the much-expected sweep with a pair of easy 5-1 victories. In his autobiography, Wayne Gretzky would attribute the Oilers' second-round loss to Calgary to the fact that the victory over Vancouver was so easy that it did not seem like they were in the playoffs yet. The Vancouver fans did not help enhance the playoff atmosphere any, as 7,854 (many of whom were clad in blue and orange) showed up for Game Three. It was a worthy reflection of the condition to which the franchise had sunken.

Player statistics

Awards and records

Transactions

Draft picks
Vancouver's draft picks at the 1985 NHL Entry Draft held at the Metro Toronto Convention Centre in Toronto, Ontario.

Farm teams

See also
1985–86 NHL season

References

External links

Vancouver Canucks seasons
Vancouver C
Vancouver